Samba-jazz or jazz samba is an instrumental subgenre of samba that emerged in the bossa nova ambit in the late 1950s and early 1960s in Brazil.

The style consolidated the approach of Brazilian samba with American jazz, especially bebop and hard bop, jazzy styles quite experienced by Brazilian musicians in scope of gafieiras and nightclubs especially in Rio de Janeiro. Having its initial formation based on the piano, the double bass and the drums, samba-jazz gradually absorbed broader musical instruments.

Unlike bossa nova, which is a style of samba characterized by its intimate spirit, soft sound and the restraint of sound elements, samba-jazz has many elements present in improvising and stridency. Nevertheless as bossa nova became well known, samba-jazz itself was favored by the bossa-novista repertoire, and a whole generation of instrumentalists influenced by American jazz, such as Sérgio Mendes, J.T. Meirelles, Edison Machado, Dom Um Romão, Zimbo Trio, Tamba Trio, Milton Banana Trio, Jongo Trio, among others, became involved with the style led by João Gilberto.

References

Sources 
 
 
 

 
Brazilian music
Brazilian styles of music